The 1976 European Women's Basketball Championship, commonly called EuroBasket Women 1976, was the 15th regional championship held by FIBA Europe. The competition was held in France and took place from 20 May to 29 May 1976.  won the gold medal and  the silver medal while  won the bronze.

Squads

Qualification

Group A

Group B

Group C

First stage

Group A

Group B

Group C

Second stage

Championship Group

8th to 13th Places Group

Final standings

External links 
 FIBA Europe profile
 Todor66 profile

 
1976
1976 in French women's sport
International women's basketball competitions hosted by France
May 1976 sports events in Europe
Euro